Todd Dwayne Williams (born March 7, 1969) is a retired long-distance runner from the United States, who represented his native country at two consecutive Summer Olympics, starting in 1992. Williams was born in Monroe, Michigan. During high school he won the Michigan team race title twice. He was a two-time United States cross country champion, with victories in 1991 and 1993. He attended the University of Tennessee where he was an All-American for three years. 
Is also a Brazilian jiu-jitsu blackbelt under Luiz Palhares and runs an ASICS sponsored company known as RunSafer.

His personal bests were 13:19.50 in the 5000 m and 27:31.34 in the 10,000 m. He ran his marathon best of 2:11:17 in the 1997 Chicago Marathon.  He is a five-time winner of the Gate River Run and set the current American record over 15 km at the event, running a time of 42:22 minutes for the distance. This is also the record for the whole of the North American, Central American and Caribbean region (NACAC).

Williams also holds the 3rd-fastest half marathon time ever by an American of 60:11 which he ran in Tokyo in 1993.

International competitions

References

 USATF profile

External links

1969 births
Living people
Track and field athletes from Detroit
American male long-distance runners
Olympic male long-distance runners
Olympic track and field athletes of the United States
Athletes (track and field) at the 1992 Summer Olympics
Athletes (track and field) at the 1996 Summer Olympics